Day of Independence is a 2003 short film, broadcast in 2005 as a half-hour PBS television special.  It is a drama, set during the Japanese American internment of World War II,  produced by Cedar Grove Productions with Visual Communications as fiscal sponsor.

History 
The story of the film is based on playwright and executive producer Tim Toyama's own father's World War II experience.  During the war, Toyama's father, whose nickname was Zip, was sent along with his entire family to a U.S. internment camp for Japanese Americans. Zip's Issei (Japanese immigrant) father fell ill and elected to return to Japan, along with Zip's mother, on a prisoner exchange ship, called the MS Gripsholm.  However, the parents told Zip that as an American, he should remain in the U.S.

Background 
Toyama wrote a play based on his family history, Independence Day. He and director Chris Tashima then adapted the play into a short film, which was produced by Lisa Onodera.  The film was shot in 6 days, in Stockton, California and in Los Angeles.  It was completed in 2003 and played in over 70 film and video festivals and competitions, winning 25 awards.  Following its broadcast premiere on KHET/PBS Hawai'i on May 12, 2005, the film received a Regional Emmy nomination, from the NATAS San Francisco/Northern California Chapter (which includes Hawaii), in the category of Historical/Cultural – Program/Special.

Synopsis
A young baseball player faces the tragic circumstances of the internment of 110,000 Americans of Japanese ancestry during World War II.  Set in a relocation camp in 1943, Day of Independence chronicles a family torn apart by a forced, unjust incarceration, a father's decision that challenges his son, and ultimately his son's triumph through courage, sacrifice and the All-American game of baseball.

Cast
 Derek Mio as Zip
 Marcus Toji as Hog
 Alan Muraoka as Father
 Keiko Kawashima as Mother
 Chris Tashima as The Umpire
(In order of appearance)
 Dean Komure as Spectator
 Lisa Joe as Frances ("National Anthem" singer)
 Diana Toshiko as Betty
 Sarah Chang as Sadie
 Julie Tofukuji as Mimi
 Ulysses Lee as Tad
 Jonathan Okui as Satch
 Gina Hiraizumi as Rose

Awards
(partial list)
Emmy Nomination - 35th Northern California Emmy Awards
CINE Golden Eagle
Platinum Best of Show - Aurora Awards
Accolade Award of Excellence, Short Film
Best Short - Stony Brook Film Festival
Best Narrative Short - Tambay Film & Video Festival
"Slate" Award, Best Short - California Independent Film Festival
Best Short Film - Houston Multicultural Independent Film Festival
Gold / 1st Prize - Crested Butte Reel Fest
Audience Award, Best Drama - Marco Island Film Festival

Trivia 
 Performance artist Dan Kwong, who is also a baseball player, coached lead actor Derek Mio in old-style pitching form.
 Lisa Joe's character, "Frances" (who sings the National Anthem at the ballgame and later conducts a choir rehearsal), was named in honor of Joe's mother, Frances Sue Okabe, a well known Nisei singer and music teacher.  Okabe was interned at the Minidoka internment camp as a teenager, where she was known for her singing.  Joe provided the singing voice on the soundtrack as well, which was recorded on Mother's Day just after her mother died from cancer.
 During one of the montage sequences of "camp life," there is a painter standing by an easel, who is portrayed by playwright Tim Toyama, who stepped in at the last moment when the person cast to play the part didn't show up for filming.
 The scene depicting the choir rehearsal has un-credited cameo appearances by noted actors Tamlyn Tomita, Emily Kuroda, Sab Shimono and Greg Watanabe who are friends of the director.

External links 
 Day of Independence now available on Vimeo
 
 Coverage of PBS broadcast  in Honolulu Star-Bulletin

References

2003 films
2003 short films
2000s sports films
American baseball films
American films based on plays
Films set in the 1940s
Films about the internment of Japanese Americans
2000s English-language films
2000s American films